Hoop Cove was a small locality located northeast of Belleoram. Like nearby Anderson's Cove, it was 'resettled' unlike other nearby former settlements such as Femme and Trammer whose largely family population dwindled away to nothing.

See also
 List of communities in Newfoundland and Labrador

Populated coastal places in Canada
Populated places in Newfoundland and Labrador